Scardina is an Italian surname, may refer to:
Filippo Maria Scardina, Italian footballer
Francesco Scardina, Italian footballer
Frederick Scardina, American soccer player
John Scardina American rule football player
Julie Scardina, American animal ambassador
Daniele Scardina, Italian Boxer

Italian-language surnames